Yan Kostenko (born 4 July 2003) is a professional Ukrainian football midfielder who currently plays for club SC Poltava in the Ukrainian Second League.

Career
Born in Poltava, Kostenko is a product of the local Vorskla Poltava youth sportive school system. 

In February 2021 he was promoted to the Vorskla's main squad and made his debut as a second half-time substituted player for Vorskla Poltava in the Ukrainian Premier League in an away losing match against SC Dnipro-1 on 19 July 2020.

References

External links
Statistics at UAF website (Ukr)

2003 births
Living people
Sportspeople from Poltava
Ukrainian footballers
FC Vorskla Poltava players
SC Poltava players
Ukrainian Premier League players

Association football midfielders